Geoffrey Symeon (also Simeon and Symson) S.T.P. (d. 21 August 1508) was a Canon of Windsor from 1501 to 1508 and Dean of Chichester from 1504 to 1508.

Career

He was educated at New College, Oxford.

He was appointed:
Senior Proctor of New College, Oxford, 1478–1479
Dean of the Chapel Royal
Prebendary of Somerley in Chichester Cathedral, 1480
Prebendary of Holywell in St Paul's Cathedral, 1494
Rector of Wheathampstead, Hertfordshire
Dean of Chichester, 1504
Dean of Lincoln, 1506
Vicar of Colerne, Wiltshire

He was appointed to the third stall in St George's Chapel, Windsor Castle in 1501, a position he held until 1508.

He was buried in the Charterhouse, London.

Notes 

1508 deaths
Alumni of New College, Oxford
Canons of Windsor
Deans of the Chapel Royal
Deans of Chichester
Deans of Lincoln
Year of birth missing